Adlercreutzia hattorii is a Gram-positive, obligately anaerobic and Rod-shaped bacterium from the genus of Adlercreutzia which has been isolated from human faeces.

References

Coriobacteriia
Bacteria described in 2021